Çağhan Kızıl (born October 14, 1981) is a Turkish/German neuroscientist and geneticist, and Associate Professor of Neurological Sciences at the Taub Institute for Research on Alzheimer's Disease and the Aging Brain at the Columbia University Vagelos College of Physicians and Surgeons Columbia University Irving Medical Center. 

His research culminates interdisciplinary approaches harboring genetics, neuroscience, cell biology, neuroimmunology, biotechnology and drug development. His team focuses on learning from Zebrafish how to enable the adult brain to better cope with neurodegenerative diseases and regenerate. By generating the first adult zebrafish brain Alzheimer's model, and single cell sequencing-based investigation of the stem cell plasticity in this model, he aims to understand the molecular programs for zebrafish brain to induce regenerative neural stem cell plasticity and to investigate the functions of human genes related to Alzheimer's disease in zebrafish brain. He develops tools for comparative studies in mammalian brains such as 3D human brain models as novel in vitro platforms for drug development.

Previously, he was leading Helmholtz research group in German Center for Neurodegenerative Diseases within Helmholtz Association. He established his lab after receiving Helmholtz Young investigator award in 2013. In 2014, he became Docent (Associate Professor) by Council of Higher Education (Turkey). In 2019, he became a tenured group leader in DZNE Dresden within the Helmholtz Association. He was the founder CEO of the first spin-off company of German Center for Neurodegenerative Diseases, Neuron-D GmbH  that specializes on 3D high-throughput drug screening platform for neurological diseases.

References

External links

1981 births
Living people
People from Zonguldak
Turkish neuroscientists
German neuroscientists
German geneticists
University of Göttingen alumni
University of Tübingen alumni
Middle East Technical University alumni
Turkish emigrants to Germany
Columbia Medical School faculty
Columbia University faculty